Grover Cleveland "Slim" Lowdermilk (January 15, 1885 – March 31, 1968) was an American Major League Baseball pitcher with the St. Louis Cardinals, Chicago Cubs, St. Louis Browns, Detroit Tigers, Cleveland Indians and Chicago White Sox between 1909 and 1920. Lowdermilk batted and threw right-handed. He was born in Sandborn, Indiana.

Quote
Grover and his brother Lou Lowdermilk both pitched for the 1911 Cardinals. He was a member of the 1919 Black Sox but was not involved in the scandal. – Grover Lowdermilk

References

External links
Baseball Almanac
Baseball Reference

1885 births
1968 deaths
Major League Baseball pitchers
St. Louis Cardinals players
Chicago Cubs players
St. Louis Browns players
Detroit Tigers players
Cleveland Indians players
Chicago White Sox players
Baseball players from Indiana
People from Marion County, Illinois
People from Knox County, Indiana
Mattoon Giants players
Mattoon Indians players
Decatur Commodores players
Springfield Senators players
Louisville Colonels (minor league) players
Portland Beavers players
Columbus Senators players
Minneapolis Millers (baseball) players